Martin Albrow (born 1937) is a British sociologist, noted for his works on globalization, the theory of the global age and global civil society. He was appointed in 1963 as the first full-time sociologist at Reading University, and subsequently worked at University College Cardiff, where he was Head of Department, and at Roehampton University. He has also held visiting or guest positions at Ludwig Maximilian University of Munich, the London School of Economics, the State University of New York at Stony Brook, the Beijing Foreign Studies University, and the University of Bonn.

Albrow was President of the British Sociological Association from 1985 to 1987, and the editor-in-chief of its journal Sociology from 1981 to 1984. Additionally, he was the founding editor of the International Sociological Association's journal, International Sociology. He wrote The Global Age: State and Society beyond Modernity, awarded the 1997 European Amalfi Prize, which argued against the view that globalization was an inevitable one-way process, and that a new age had supplanted both the modern and postmodern ages. He is a Fellow of the Academy of Social Sciences.

Albrow lives in London with his wife, Sue Owen.

His books include: Bureaucracy, London, Pall Mall, 1970; Max Weber's Construction of Social Theory, London, Macmillan, 1990; The Global Age: State and Society beyond Modernity, Cambridge, Polity 1996; Do Organizations Have Feelings?, London and New York, Routledge, 1997; Sociology: The Basics, London and New York, Routledge, 1999; and Global Age Essays on Social and Cultural Change, Frankfurt am Main, Klosterman, 2014. The English-language edition of his book China's Role in a Shared Human Future was published in 2018. The book was launched at the London Book Fair.

In an interview with Xinhua on 29 October 2022, Albrow stated that Chinese strongman and Communist Party chief Xi Jinping was an "absolutely outstanding" political theorist and that his so-called Xi Jinping Thought was an "outstanding theoretical achievement of global significance".

References

1937 births
Living people
British sociologists
Writers about globalization
Presidents of the British Sociological Association